Priyanka Sarkar is an Indian film and television actress who mosty works in Bengali films. Her first successful film was Chirodini Tumi Je Amar (2008) directed by Raj Chakraborty. She  is married to actor Rahul Banerjee.

Filmography

Television 
 Aastha
 Khela(Zee Bangla)
 Nana Ranger Dinguli
 Ebar Jalsha Rannaghare
 Mahanayak
 Ebar Jalsha Rannaghare (season 2)
 Abhyamangal [Mahalaya Special TV Program For Star Jalsha ]
 Sun Bangla Super Family [Reality Game Show For Sun Bangla ]

Web series

References

External links 
 

Actresses in Bengali cinema
Bengali television actresses
Living people
Actresses from Kolkata
Indian film actresses
Indian television actresses
21st-century Indian actresses
Year of birth missing (living people)